Jim Shirra (born 10 June 1950) is a Scottish professional footballer who spent the majority of his career playing for Falkirk, where he made over 180 league appearances and scored 27 goals. He also played for Aberdeen and Dundee before leaving for Melbourne, Australia where he played in the National Soccer League for South Melbourne Hellas, one of Australia's most successful clubs. Shirra later returned to Scotland where he played for Stirling Albion in the second division of the Scottish Football League

References 
Jim Shirra at Aussie Footballers

1950 births
Living people
Footballers from Falkirk
Scottish footballers
Association football midfielders
National Soccer League (Australia) players
Falkirk F.C. players
Aberdeen F.C. players
Dundee F.C. players
South Melbourne FC players
Stirling Albion F.C. players
Scottish Football League players
Scottish expatriate sportspeople in Australia
Scottish expatriate footballers
Expatriate soccer players in Australia